Chastity Reed (born March 28, 1989) is an American professional women's basketball player who plays for Panathinaikos in the Greek League.

Arkansas–Little Rock statistics

Source

WNBA
Reed was selected in the third round of the 2011 WNBA Draft (25th overall) by the Tulsa Shock. Reed was with the Shock for thirteen games, playing in eleven, including one start, before being waived by interim coach and GM Teresa Edwards one week after she replaced Nolan Richardson. For the 2012 WNBA season, Reed is in the training camp of the Phoenix Mercury.

References 

1989 births
Living people
American women's basketball players
Basketball players from New Orleans
Little Rock Trojans women's basketball players
Tulsa Shock draft picks
Tulsa Shock players
Forwards (basketball)
Panathinaikos WBC players